This list of museums in Derbyshire, England contains museums which are defined for this context as institutions (including nonprofit organizations, government entities, and private businesses) that collect and care for objects of cultural, artistic, scientific, or historical interest and make their collections or related exhibits available for public viewing. Also included are non-profit art galleries and university art galleries.  Museums that exist only in cyberspace (i.e., virtual museums) are not included.

Museums

Defunct museums
 Heanor Heritage Centre, Heanor, closed in 2005

References

 Visit Derbyshire
 Discover Derbyshire and the Peak District

See also

 Visitor attractions in Derbyshire

 
Derbyshire
Museums
museums_in_Derbyshire